Singhpora is a town and municipality located on the Srinagar–Baramulla road (part of National Highway 1) in Baramulla district of the Indian union territory of Jammu and Kashmir.

References 
 

Cities and towns in Srinagar district